The women's 5000 meter at the 2014 KNSB Dutch Single Distance Championships took place in Heerenveen at the Thialf ice skating rink on Sunday 27 October 2013. Although this tournament was held in 2013, it was part of the 2013–2014 speed skating season.

There were 10 participants. There was a qualification selection incentive for the next following 2013–14 ISU Speed Skating World Cup tournaments.

Title holder was Marije Joling.

Overview

Result

Draw

Source:

References

Single Distance Championships
2014 Single Distance
World